Otto Michael Kaus  (January 7, 1920 – January 11, 1996) was an Austrian-born American lawyer and judge from the State of California.

Early life and education
Kaus was born in Vienna, Austria, as the first child of the writers Otto F. Kaus and Regina Weiner. He was already attending school in Great Britain when the rest of his family fled the Nazis in the 1930s. Immigrating to the United States in 1940, his family settled in Los Angeles, California. He graduated from the University of California at Los Angeles in 1942 with a B.A., and then joined the U.S. Army, where he served until 1945. Following his discharge, he graduated from Loyola Law School in 1949, and was admitted to the state bar that year. He then joined the law firm of Chase, Rotchford, Downen & Drukker, where he practiced for 11 years and became a partner.

Judicial and legal career
In December 1961, Kaus was appointed as a judge on the Los Angeles County Superior Court by Governor Pat Brown and, on December 28, 1964, Brown elevated Kaus to the California Court of Appeal, Second District, where he served until 1981. On the appellate court, Kaus served as an associate justice of Division Three until December 16, 1966, and then as Presiding Justice of Division Five until July 21, 1981.

In July 1981, Kaus was chosen to serve as Associate Justice of the California Supreme Court by Governor Jerry Brown, whose father had appointed Kaus to his previous post. He was confirmed with little trouble. In 1982, Kaus was on the ballot for retention by the voters, along with fellow justices Cruz Reynoso and Allen Broussard. However, the state Supreme Court had become controversial due to the growing perception by many that Brown's appointees, particularly Chief Justice Rose Bird, were liberal ideologues whose rulings were political. Although Kaus was considered the least ideological and most independent of Brown's appointees, he was reconfirmed by 57 percent of the voters, far less than expected, after a campaign was waged against Brown's appointees that year.

After being retained, Kaus was shaken by the campaign against him and feared for the independence of the state judiciary. He later remarked, "You cannot forget the fact that you have a crocodile in your bathtub. You keep wondering whether you're letting yourself be influenced, and you do not know. You do not know yourself that well". In addition, his mother-in-law was in failing health. So in October 1985, Kaus resigned from the court. He was replaced by Edward A. Panelli.

While on the bench, his notable cases include his concurring opinion in National Audubon Society v. Superior Court (1983), concerning the conflict between the public trust doctrine and appropriative water rights. In 1984, he wrote the opinion for a unanimous court in People v. Bledsoe that rape trauma syndrome is inadmissible as evidence of the crime.

After leaving the judiciary, Kaus resumed private practice, forming the law firm of Hufstedler & Kaus in 1986 (the other "name" partner was former U.S. Secretary of Education Shirley Hufstedler), where he occasionally argued cases before the state Supreme Court where he had once served. He also mentored then-associate Jeffrey Ehrlich, who would later rise to national prominence for arguing cases in the United States and California Supreme Court.

Personal life
On January 12, 1943, he married Alice Jane Berta Huttenbach, known as Peggy Alice Kaus (February 8, 1923 – July 5, 2011), in Hyannis, Massachusetts, and they had two sons: Stephen and "Mickey".

Kaus retired from the practice of law in 1995, as he was diagnosed with lung cancer. On January 11, 1996, he died in Beverly Hills, California. His wife and son, Mickey, were at his side.

References

Further reading
 Hufstedler, Shirley M. (1997). "Tribute to Otto M. Kaus", 30 Loy. L.A. L. Rev. 937.

Video

External links
 In Memoriam Justice Otto M. Kaus. California Supreme Court (1997).
 Former Justices and Otto Kaus biography. California Court of Appeal, Second District.
 Articles.sfgate.com
 Opinions authored by Otto Kaus. Courtlistener.com.
 Past & Present Justices. California State Courts.

See also
 List of justices of the Supreme Court of California

1920 births
1996 deaths
Jewish emigrants from Austria to the United States after the Anschluss
United States Army personnel of World War II
Jewish American military personnel
Deaths from lung cancer in California
20th-century American judges
20th-century American lawyers
Superior court judges in the United States
Judges of the California Courts of Appeal
Justices of the Supreme Court of California
University of California, Los Angeles alumni
Loyola Law School alumni
USC Gould School of Law faculty
Lawyers from Los Angeles
20th-century American Jews